The Hinterautal-Vomper Chain, also called the main chain of the Karwendel (Karwendelhauptkette), is the longest mountain chain in the Karwendel Alps in Austria. It has numerous peaks that reach heights of 2,500 m, including the highest summit of the Karwendel, the Birkkarspitze, and its neighbour, the three Ödkarspitzen. While long ridges radiate south and north from the western part of the main chain, with typical Karwendel cirques nestling between them, the eastern part of the chain has an almost 1,000 m high, solid rock face on the northern side, which is most striking at the Laliderer Wand. The main chain is divided into the Hinterautal ("Hinterau Valley") chain (Hinterautalkette) in the west and the Vomper Chain (Vomperkette) in the east and runs through the Karwendel Alps from Scharnitz in the west to the village of Vomp in the east.

North of the Hinterautal-Vomper Chain is the Northern Karwendel Chain (Nördliche Karwendelkette), to the south follows the Gleirsch-Halltal Chain, large parts of which have steep, northern slopes, often vertical and hundreds of metres high which are typical of the four Karwendel mountain chains.

Along the western part of the Hinterautal-Vomper Chain runs a difficult, high alpine mountain path which is called the Toni Gaugg Mountain Path (Toni-Gaugg-Höhenweg) after the man who blazed it. This enables the Hinterautal chain to be traversed from the Pleisen Hut to the Karwendelhaus.

In the Northern Limestone Alps, to which the Karwendel belongs, there are a number of small and very small glaciers. In the Hinterautal-Vomper Chain is the only glacier of the Karwendel, the Eiskarln, north of and below the Eiskarlspitze.

Important summits 

The mountains in the chain, listed from west to east, are as follows:
 Pleisenspitze
 Larchetkarspitze
 Große Riedlkarspitze
 Breitgrieskarspitze
 Oberer Spitzhüttenkopf
 Große Seekarspitze
 Marxenkarspitze
 Western Ödkarspitze
 Middle Ödkarspitze
 Eastern Ödkarspitze
 Hochalmkreuz
 Birkkarspitze
 Kaltwasserkarspitze
 Rauhkarlspitze
 Moserkarspitze
 Northern Sonnenspitze
 Southern Sonnenspitze
 Laliderer Spitze
 Dreizinkenspitze
 Grubenkarspitze
 Rossloch crest (Rosslochkamm)
 Sunntigerspitze
 Hallerangerspitze
 Gamskarspitze
 Brantlspitze
 Hochkanzel
 Rosslochspitze
 Spritzkarspitze
 Spitzkarlspitze
 Eiskarlspitze
 Hochglück
 Huderbankspitze
 Barthspitze, named after Hermann von Barth, the "Explorer of the Karwendel"
 Schafkarspitze
 Mitterkarlspitze
 Lamsenspitze
 Rotwandlspitze
 Steinkarlspitze
 Hochnissl
 Schneekopf
 Mittagspitze
 Fiechter Spitze

External links 

Mountain ranges of the Alps
Mountain ranges of Tyrol (state)
Karwendel